Pakistan participated at the 2014 Commonwealth Games in Glasgow, Scotland. The Pakistan Olympic Association announced that its delegation for the games would consist of 62 athletes in 11 sports, but only 48 competed. Pakistan participated in badminton, boxing, gymnastics, judo, lawn bowling, shooting, swimming, table tennis, weightlifting and wrestling.

Medallists

Badminton

Boxing

Men

Gymnastics

Gymnastics Artistic

Judo

Men

Lawn Bowls

Men's singles 

Section B, Rd 1, Match 3

S. Tuikiligana (FIJ) 21 - M. Shahzad (PAK) 16

Section B, Rd 2, Match 1

R. Bester (CAN) 21 - M. Shahzad (PAK) 15

Section B, Rd 3, Match 2

M.H. Abdul Rais (MAS) 21 - M. Shahzad (PAK) 5

Section B, Rd 4, Match 3

S. Bahadur (IND) 20 - M. Shahzad (PAK) 18

Men's Triples 

 Maqsood Khan - Men's Triples
 Mohammad Qureshi - Men's Triples
 Muzhair Shan - Men's Triples

Section B, Rd 1, Match 1

Pakistan 12 - Australia 19

Section B, Rd 2, Match 3

Pakistan 12 - Papua New Guinea 17

Section B, Rd 3, Match 3

Pakistan 9 - England 24

Section B, Rd 4, Match 2

Pakistan 12 - Malaysia 24

Section B, Rd 5, Match 3

Pakistan 15 - Falkland Islands 23

Shooting

Men

Women

Swimming

Men

Women

Table tennis

Men

 
Women

Weightlifting

Wrestling

Men's freestyle

References

Pakistan at the Commonwealth Games
Nations at the 2014 Commonwealth Games
2014 in Pakistani sport